The 2013–14 season is Hyderabad cricket team's 80th competitive season. The Hyderabad cricket team is senior men's domestic cricket team based in the city of Hyderabad, India, run by the Hyderabad Cricket Association. They represent the region of Telangana in the state of Andhra Pradesh in domestic competitions.

Competition Overview

Squads
 Head Coach: Sunil Joshi
 Fielding Coach : T Dilip

NKP Salve Challenger Trophy
Akshath Reddy got selected for India Blue squad for 2013-14 NKP Salve Challenger Trophy, a List-A cricket tournament in India.

Duleep Trophy
Akshath Reddy and Pragyan Ojha got selected for South Zone squad for 2013-14 Duleep Trophy, a first-class cricket tournament in India.

Deodhar Trophy
Pragyan Ojha got selected for South Zone squad for 2013-14 Deodhar Trophy, a List A cricket competition in India.

Indian Premier League
Mumbai Indians picked Pragyan Ojha while local franchise, Sunrisers Hyderabad picked Ashish Reddy and Chama Milind in the IPL Auction for 2014 Indian Premier League season.

Ranji Trophy

The Hyderabad began their campaign in the Ranji Trophy, the premier first-class cricket tournament in India, with a draw against the Andhra at Hyderabad on 27 October 2013. They finished sixth in Group C with a win, seven draws and no losses.

Points Table
Group C

 Top two teams advanced to knockout stage and promoted to Group A / B for 2014–15 Ranji Trophy.

Matches
Group Stage

Statistics
Most runs

 Source: Cricinfo
Most wickets

 Source: Cricinfo

Vijay Hazare Trophy
The Hyderabad began their campaign in the Vijay Hazare Trophy, a List A cricket tournament in India, with a win against the Kerala at Alur on 27 February 2014. They finished in fourth in South Zone with two wins, two losses and a tie.

Points Table
South Zone

Matches
Zonal Stage

Statistics
Most runs

 Source: Cricinfo
Most wickets

 Source: Cricinfo

Syed Mushtaq Ali Trophy
The Hyderabad began their campaign in the Syed Mushtaq Ali Trophy, a Twenty20 tournament in India, against the Kerala at Visakhapatnam on 1 April 2014. They finished fourth in South Zone with two wins and three losses.

Points Table
South Zone

Matches
Zonal Stage

Statistics
Most runs

 Source: Cricinfo
Most wickets

 Source: Cricinfo

See also
Hyderabad cricket team 
Hyderabad Cricket Association

References

External links
Hyderabad cricket team official site

Cricket in Hyderabad, India
Cricket in Telangana
Sport in Telangana